William McLachlan is a Canadian ice dancer. He competed first with partner Geraldine Fenton, and later with Virginia Thompson. He won five medals at the World Figure Skating Championships, two silvers and a bronze with Fenton, and one silver and a bronze with Thompson.

Competitive highlights
(with Fenton)

(with Thompson)

References
 
 

Canadian male ice dancers
Living people
World Figure Skating Championships medalists
Year of birth missing (living people)
20th-century Canadian people